Piotr Skiba (born 7 July 1982) is a Polish footballer who plays as a goalkeeper for Stomil Olsztyn.

Career

In 2006, Skiba signed for English non-league side Bradford (Park Avenue) after trialing for Leeds United in the English second division and playing for Polish fourth division club Stomil Olsztyn. After that, Skiba played for Ossett Town, Guiseley, and Farsley Celtic in the English non-league, where he threw the ball into his own goal during a 3-1 win over AFC Telford United.

In 2007, Skiba represented England C against Sheffield FC.

In 2010, he signed for Polish fourth division team Huragan Morąg.

Before the second half of 2010.11, Skiba returned to Stomil Olsztyn in the Polish third division, where he rejected an offer from Polish top flight outfit Zagłębie Lubin.

In 2014, he established 4keepers, a goalkeeper glove shop.

References

External links
 
 
 

Polish footballers
Polish expatriate sportspeople in England
Polish expatriate footballers
Expatriate footballers in England
Association football goalkeepers
Living people
I liga players
1982 births
II liga players
Gryf Wejherowo players
Bradford (Park Avenue) A.F.C. players
Guiseley A.F.C. players
Farsley Celtic F.C. players
Sportspeople from Olsztyn
OKS Stomil Olsztyn players